Nevada holmgrenii is a flowering plant in the mustard family, Brassicaceae, endemic to Nevada in the United States. It is the only species in the genus Nevada. It was first described as Smelowskia holmgrenii.

References

Brassicaceae
Flora of Nevada
Flora without expected TNC conservation status